Bergiaria is a small genus of long-whiskered catfishes native to South America.

Species
There are currently two recognized species in this genus:
 Bergiaria platana (Steindachner, 1908)
 Bergiaria westermanni (Lütken, 1874)

References

Pimelodidae
Fish of South America
Catfish genera
Taxa named by Carl H. Eigenmann
Freshwater fish genera